The Hypertrophinae are a subfamily of small moths in the family Depressariidae. The subfamily was described by Thomas Bainbrigge Fletcher in 1929.

Taxonomy and systematics
Acraephnes Turner, 1947
Allotropha Diakonoff, 1954
Callizyga Turner, 1894
Eomystis Meyrick, 1888
Epithetica Turner, 1923
Eupselia Meyrick, 1880
Hypertropha Meyrick, 1880
Oxytropha Diakonoff, 1954
Peritropha Diakonoff, 1954
Polygiton Diakonoff, 1955
Progonica Turner, 1947
Thudaca Walker, 1864

References

 
Depressariidae
Moth subfamilies